Hanoi National University of Education (Abbreviation: HNUE) is a public university in Vietnam. Established in 1951 as the fourth university in Vietnam (after Indochina Medical College (1902), University of Indochina (1904), École Supérieure des Beaux-Arts de L'Indochine (1925)), it is one of the largest higher education institutions in this country. The university also operates HNUE High school for gifted students, a national high school for gifted students.

Established in 1951 with the name of National University of Science Education, the school was headed by Prof Lê Văn Thiêm, the father of Vietnam's Mathematics society. In 1956, it was merged with National University of Arts and Social Science Education and renamed Hanoi University of Education. In 1993, the university, along with University of Hanoi and Foreign Language Teachers’ Training College, became the main posts for the establishment of Vietnam National University, Hanoi (VNUH). However, thanks to the Vietnam government's requirement for establishing an independent institution to train teachers, the university was split from VNUH in 1999 and renamed the Hanoi National University of Education - a hitherto major national university in Vietnam.

The biggest astronomical optical telescope in South East Asia is situated on the school campus. In 2008, HNUE was the host for the 39th International Physics Olympiad.

History 
Hanoi National University of Education was founded on 11 October 1951. Since then, it has been accredited by the Ministry of Education and Training of Vietnam (MOET), which has also managed and awarded the university's undergraduate and post-graduate degrees. HNUE was a member of Vietnam National University, Hanoi for 6 years (1993-1999). It is one of the 14 key national universities in Vietnam.

Milestones 

 10/10/1945: Department of Social Sciences and Humanity – Hanoi, precursor of HNUE, was founded
 11/10/1951: National University of Science Education was established
 1956: Hanoi University of Education established

Present form 
There are about 10,000 on-campus students, and more than 30,000 undergraduate and 1,500 postgraduate enrollments each year. Currently, the total number of full-time faculty and staff of HNUE is more than 1,300, including nearly 800 professors and lecturers across departments and schools on campus.

Education 
HNUE has a semester-based modular system for conducting courses. There are two semesters per academic year, and new students are usually enrolled in fall semesters. Today, HNUE has 25 faculties and schools across the campus in Hanoi, and provides a broad-based curriculum underscored by multi-disciplinary courses and cross-faculty enrichment.

Structure 
The university encompasses a wide range of offices and services, training faculties and departments, centers and institutes as well as affiliated schools.

Faculties and departments 
Major faculties and departments in the university include:
 Faculty of Arts
 Faculty of Biology
 Faculty of Chemistry
 Faculty of Early Childhood Education
 Faculty of Education Management
 Faculty of English Language
 Faculty of French Language
 Faculty of Geography
 Faculty of History
 Faculty of Information Technology
 Faculty of Mathematics-Informatics
 Faculty of Linguistics and Literature
 Faculty of National Defense Education
 Faculty of Physical Education
 Faculty of Physics
 Faculty of Political Education
 Faculty of Primary Education
 Faculty of Psychology & Pedagogy
 Faculty of Social Work
 Faculty of Special Education
 Faculty of Technology Education
 Faculty of Vietnam Studies
 Department of Chinese Language
 Department of Russian Language

Research institutes and centers 
 Institute for Educational Research
 Institute of Social Sciences Research
 Research Centers:
 Center for Applied Geography (CAG)
 Center for Biodiversity Resources, Education and Development (CEBRED)
 Center for Children Language, Literature and Arts
 Center for Complex and Function Analysis
 Center for Computational Science (CSS)
 Center for Cryptozoic and Rare Animals Research
 Center for Environmental Research and Education
 Center for Environmental Research and Education
 Center for Experimental Biology
 Center for Mangrove Ecosystem Research (MERC)
 Center for Nano Science and Technology
 Center for Research and Teacher Professional Development
 Center for Soil Animals Research
 Hanoi Center for Financial and Industrial Mathematics
 Training Centers
 Center for Advanced Training Technology Application (CATTA)
 Center for Applied Informatics
 Center for Continuing Training and Professional Development
 Centre for International Education and Training (CIET)
 Center for Special Education Training and Research
 Institute for Social Science Studies

Affiliated schools 
 HNUE High school for gifted students (Truong THPT Chuyen Dai hoc Su pham)
 Nguyen Tat Thanh School
 Bup Sen Xanh Kindergarten

Presidents and principals

Alumni 
Since its inception in 1951, HNUE has had many distinguished alumni, including well-known professors, educators, politicians, writers, business executives, and local public figures. Some popular names are:
 Cao Huy Đỉnh (1927-1975): Professor, Vietnam folk culture researcher, Ho Chi Minh national award Giải thưởng Hồ Chí Minh Phase 1 (1996); 
 Nguyễn Văn Hiệu: Professor, PhD in physics; chairman, Scientific Council of Materials Science, Vietnam Academy of Science and Technology (VAST); Vice-chairman, State Committee for Science and Technology of Vietnam, 1970–75; vice-pres., Natl. Centre for Scientific Research of Vietnam, 1975–82; member, Intl. Committee for Future Accelerators, 1984–86; chairman, Committee for Space Research and Application in Vietnam, 1983–98; and pres., VAST, 1983–2002; chairman, General Council of Asia Pacific Center for Theoretical Physics (APCTP) Seoul-Pohang, 1996–2002; chairman, Board of Trustees of APCTP, 2004–2010; a founding principal of the University of Technology, Vietnam National University, Hanoi (VNUH). He was awarded the Lenin Prize for Science and Technology, USSR, in 1986, and was a member of the Russian Acadedemy of Sciences.
 Nguyễn Văn Đạo: Prof.PhD in Mechanical Engineering, Director of Vietnam National University, Hanoi (VNUH), President of Vietnam Association of Mechanical Industry, Member of Russian Academy of Sciences 
 Nguyễn Khoa Điềm: Poet; Minister, Ministry of Information and Communications (Vietnam)
 Vũ Đình Cự: Professor, PhD in physics, Former vice-president of the National Parliament of Vietnam.
 Phan Đình Diệu: Professor of Math, President of Vietnam Union of Science and Technology associations, deputy director of Information and Technology Development Committee (Phase 1)
 Dương Trung Quốc: Historist, General Secretary Vietnam History Association Hội Khoa học Lịch sử Việt Nam, Member of Parliament
 Dương Thụ: Musician
 Phạm Tiến Duật: Poet
 Nguyễn Đình Trí: Professor, PhD in Math, President of Vietnam Mathematical Association
 Vũ Đình Hòa: Professor, PhD in Math; Faculty, Vietnam National University, Hanoi; Direct of FPT Young Talents
 Nguyễn Huy Thiệp: Writer (graduated from Faculty of History);
 Trần Khải Thanh Thủy: Writer
 Văn Như Cương: Member, National Education Association; President and Founder of Luong The Vinh High School for the Gifted.
 Đàm Bích Thủy: Director, National Australia Bank Vietnam Representative Office; President of Citibank Vietnam.; President of Fulbright University Vietnam

References

External links 

 The Official Website of Hanoi National University of Education
 The Official Website of the 39th International Physics Olympiad

Hanoi National University of Education
Educational institutions established in 1951
1951 establishments in Vietnam